Like all municipalities of Puerto Rico, Dorado is subdivided into administrative units called barrios, which are roughly comparable to minor civil divisions, (and means wards or boroughs or neighborhoods in English). The barrios and subbarrios, in turn, are further subdivided into smaller local populated place areas/units called sectores (sectors in English). The types of sectores may vary, from normally sector to urbanización to reparto to barriada to residencial, among others.

List of sectors by barrio

Dorado barrio-pueblo

	Barriada San Antonio
	Residencial Manuel Morales
	Sector Finca Santa Bárbara
	Sector Juan Francisco
	Sector La Julia
	Sector Mameyal Playa (stretch of PR-165)
	Urbanización Brisas de Plata (before Villa Caíto)
	Urbanización Jardines de Dorado
	Urbanización Martorell
	Urbanización Sabanera Dorado

Espinosa

	Apartamentos Altos de Miraflores 
	Comunidad Fortuna
	Comunidad La PRRA 
	Comunidad Río Nuevo
	Parcelas Kuilan
	PR-2 stretch (both sides between kilometers 25.4 and 28.0)
	Reparto Del Valle
	Sector Abayarde
	Sector Concepción
	Sector Cuba Libre 
	Sector Guarisco
	Sector Jácana
	Sector Kuilan 
	Sector La Ínea
	Sector Laguna I y II
	Sector Los Morales
	Sector Mavito
	Sector Reparto Dorado
	Sector Rodríguez
	Sector Romanes
	Sector Silverio Mojica (Chícharo) 
	Sector Tiburón
	Urbanización Golden Hills
	Urbanización Haciendas de Dorado
	Urbanización Los Montes
	Urbanización Miraflores
	Urbanización Monte Bello 
	Urbanización Monte Mar 
	Urbanización Monte Mayor
	Urbanización Monte Real
	Urbanización Monte Sol
	Urbanización Monte Verde
	Urbanización Palmar Dorado
	Urbanización Valle Dorado

Higuillar

	Apartamentos Brisas del Mar
	Apartamentos Camino Dorado
	Apartamentos Plantation Village Apartment 1
	Apartamentos Plantation Village Apartment 2
	Apartamentos Plantation Village Apartment 3 
	Apartamentos Villas de Costa Mar
	Comunidad Mameyal
	Condominio Costa Dorada
	Condominio Fairway Village Apartments
	Condominio Ocean Villas
	Condominio Villa de Playa I y II
	Condominio Villas de Dorado
	Condominio Villas de Golf Este
	Condominio Villas de Golf Oeste 
	Hogar Costa de Oro Village
	PR-695 
	Reparto San Carlos
	Sector Aldea
	Sector Arenal
	Sector Costa de Oro
	Sector Cuatro Calles
	Sector Hormigas
	Sector La Poza
	Sector La Prá
	Sector Los Puertos
	Sector Marismilla
	Sector Monte Lindo
	Sector San Antonio
	Sector Santa Bárbara
	Sector Sardinera
	Sector Villa 2000
	Sector Villa Palmas
	Sector Villa Plata
	Sector Villa Santa
	Urbanización Brighton Country Club
	Urbanización Dorado Beach Cottages
	Urbanización Dorado Beach East
	Urbanización Dorado Beach Estate
	Urbanización Dorado Beach
	Urbanización Dorado Country Estate
	Urbanización Dorado Del Mar
	Urbanización Dorado Reef
	Urbanización Doraville
	Urbanización Gable Breeze
	Urbanización Hacienda Mi Querido Viejo
	Urbanización Jardín Dorado
	Urbanización Los Prados de Dorado Norte y Sur
	Urbanización Monte Elena
	Urbanización Paisajes de Dorado
	Urbanización Paseo de Dorado
	Urbanización Paseo del Mar
	Urbanización Paseo del Sol
	Urbanización Paseo Las Olas
	Urbanización Paseo Las Palmas
	Urbanización Paseo Los Corales
	Urbanización Paseo Real
	Urbanización Plantation Village
	Urbanización Quintas de Dorado
	Urbanización Ritz-Carlton Reserve East Beach 
	Urbanización Ritz-Carlton Reserve West Beach 
	Urbanización The Enclave
	Urbanización The Greens
	Urbanización Villamar

Maguayo

	Parcelas El Cotto
	Sector Abra
	Sector Calandria
	Sector Camino Los Nieves
	Sector Cotto Martell
	Sector Cuatro Calles
	Sector El Cotto
	Sector Los Bloise
	Sector Los Dávila
	Sector Los Torres
	Sector Maguayo Adentro
	Sector Maracayo
	Sector Martell
	Sector Maysonet I y II
	Sector Polvorín
	Sector Río Nuevo (PR-693)
	Sector Santa Rosa (Jazmín, Guayabo, Combate)
	Urbanización Alturas de Plata
	Urbanización Bosque Dorado
	Urbanización Valle del Dorado

Mameyal
There are no sectors in Mameyal barrio which is a beach area, but 11 residents were counted in Mameyal in the 2010 US Census.
There is a large natural reserve in Mameyal called .

Río Lajas

	Parcelas Viejas
	Sector Alturas de Río Lajas
	Sector El Rincón
	Sector Las Corozas
	Sector Villa Iriarte
	Urbanización Molinos del Río

See also

 List of communities in Puerto Rico

References

Dorado
Dorado